Ninja Girl & Samurai Master, known in Japan as , is a Japanese four-panel manga series written and illustrated by Naoki Shigeno. It has been serialized in Hakusensha's seinen manga magazine Young Animal since June 2008, with its chapters collected in 19 tankōbon volumes as of July 2022. The series is about a fictional shinobi named Chidori who aids the real Japanese general Oda Nobunaga on his journey to the unification of Japan, so that he may bring peace to the land.

The series has spawned various spin-off manga series. An anime television series adaptation directed by Akitaro Daichi and animated by TMS Entertainment was broadcast for three seasons between October 2016 and September 2018, totalling 78 episodes. The series was licensed by Crunchyroll.

Characters

An extremely skilled shinobi that is also very clumsy. She was saved from drowning by Nobunaga as a young girl, and thus wants to serve him with all her strength. She is shown to be so skilled that she is able to easily take on one of the leading male ninjas from Koga who has had years of training (though is defeated through her own idiocy). She is also able to persuade many political leaders to Nobunaga's side.

The first leading unifier of Japan since the collapse of the old shogunate, who throughout the series works to defeat other daimyos to bring peace to the land. He saved Chidori from drowning when she was young, thus earning her loyalty. He is a very skilled commander, beating out many other daimyos and gaining the support of the Shogun. His three weaknesses, as listed by Chidori, are Oichi (his younger sister), alcohol, and sweets.

Chidori's friend and fellow shinobi. He seems to have a crush on Chidori. His skill is currently unknown, but he is shown to be an inventor of sorts; Chidori uses a smoke bomb designed by him.

The wife of Nobunaga. She is very airheaded, and as such Nobunaga doesn't trust her with doing anything. However, he still loves her.

One of Nobunaga's most trusted generals, though he started out as an errand boy. He seems to be unable to die (getting shot multiple times with arrows, among other things) and is extremely clumsy and dense.

Hideyoshi's wife, who was friends with him from childhood. She has an extreme Tsundere personality and is terrible at cooking, but loves Hideyoshi very much.

The younger sister of Nobunaga. He loves her very much, listed by Chidori as one of his weaknesses. She is married to Azai Nagamasa, who finds her extremely cute and beautiful, essentially having love at first sight.

Nobunaga's retainer, a gallant spear fighter.

The wealthy head of the Ikkō sect.

Kennyo's irritable wife.

Media

Manga
Written and illustrated by Naoki Shigeno, Nobunaga no Shinobi began its serialization in Hakusensha's seinen manga magazine Young Animal on June 13, 2008. Hakusensha has collected its chapters into individual tankōbon volumes. The first volume was released on June 29, 2009. As of July 29, 2022, nineteen volumes have been released.

Spin-offs
A spin-off series, titled  was serialized in Young Animal Arashi from November 2, 2012, to May 2, 2017. Hakusensha collected its chapters in three tankōbon, released from August 29, 2014, to July 28, 2017.

A second spin-off series, titled , was serialized in Young Animal Densi web magazine from April 26, 2013, to June 30, 2017, and was later transferred to the Manga Park website and app starting on October 3, 2017. The first volume was published on January 29, 2014. As of July 29, 2021, five volumes have been released.

A third spin-off series, titled , was published in Leed Publishing's Comic Ran Twins Sengoku Busho Retsuden from October 26, 2013, to June 27, 2016. and later in Comic Ran Twins from October 13, 2016, to July 14, 2020. Its chapters were collected in four volumes, released from July 29, 2015, to September 29, 2020.

A fourth spin-off, titled , was serialized in Young Animal Densi from January 30, 2015, to June 16, 2017, and was later transferred to the Manga Park website and app starting on August 23, 2017. The first volume was released on April 28, 2016. As of July 29, 2021, three volumes have been released.

Anime
Preceded by an "Episode 0" screened at the AnimeJapan 2016 event between March 25 and 27, an anime television series adaptation, directed by Akitaro Daichi and animated at TMS Entertainment, aired for twenty-six episodes on TV Aichi and Tokyo MX between October 4, 2016, and March 28, 2017.

A second twenty-six-episode season, titled Ninja Girl & Samurai Master 2nd, known in Japan as, aired from April 8 to September 30, 2017.

The series has been streamed by Crunchyroll.

Notes

References

External links
 Nobunaga no Shinobi official manga website at Young Animal 
  
 

2016 anime television series debuts
2018 anime television series debuts
Anime series based on manga
Comedy anime and manga
Hakusensha franchises
Hakusensha manga
Historical anime and manga
Seinen manga
TMS Entertainment
Works about Oda Nobunaga
Yonkoma